Shimon Yehuda Shkop (1860 – October 22, 1939) was a rosh yeshiva (dean) of the Yeshiva of Telshe and then of Yeshiva Shaar HaTorah of Grodno, and a Talmid Chacham (Talmudic scholar).

Early life 
Shkop was born in Torez, today in Belarus, in 1860. At the age of twelve he went to study in the Mir Yeshiva for two years. He then traveled to the Volozhin yeshiva where he studied with Naftali Zvi Yehuda Berlin for six years. His study partners included Chaim Ozer Grodzinski.

Telz and Grodno
Shkop married a niece of Eliezer Gordon, and in 1884 was appointed a rosh mesivta at Telz Yeshiva, where he remained for 18 years. While there, he developed a system of Talmudic study which became known as the "Telz way of learning;"  this combined the logical analysis of Chaim Soloveitchik with the simplicity and clarity of Naftali Zvi Yehuda Berlin.

In 1903, he became rabbi of Moltsh, and in 1907 of Bransk.  Among his students in Moltsh was Yechezkel Sarna, who studied under Shkop for a year in 1906, before leaving to the Slabodka yeshiva when Shkop himself left.

 
From 1920 to 1939 he was Rosh Yeshiva of the Yeshiva Sha'ar HaTorah in Grodno.

Yeshiva University
In 1928, Shkop traveled to the United States in order to raise funds for the Yeshiva. After delivering a lecture at Yeshiva University, he became Rosh Yeshiva of Rabbi Isaac Elchanan Theological Seminary in New York. In 1929, Shkop returned to Europe.

Students 
His students included:
 Michoel Fisher
 Yisrael Zev Gustman
 Yosef Shlomo Kahaneman
 Shmuel Rozovsky
 Isser Yehuda Unterman
 Elchonon Wasserman

Major works
Sha'arei Yosher (1925)
Ma'arekhet ha-Kinyanim (1936)
Novellae on tractates Bava Kamma, Bava Metzia, and Bava Basra (1947)
Novellae on Nedarim, Gittin, and Kiddushin (1952)
Novellae on Yevamos and Ketuvot (1957)

Sha'arei Yosher is largely concerned with the intellectual principles by which the law is established, rather than with concrete laws, and is stylistically similar to the Shev Shema'tata of Aryeh Leib HaCohen Heller, on which it was partly based.

Death
As the Russian army was about to enter Grodno during World War II, Shkop ordered his students to flee to Vilna. He himself died two days later, on the 9th of Cheshvan 5700 (1939) in Grodno. Shkop is buried in the Jewish cemetery in the Zaniemanski Forshtat section of Grodno.

References

External links
 Shaarei Yosher Vol 1 with commentaries, Jerusalem, 5770, Harav Daniel Meir Assayag 
 Shaarei Yosher Vol 2 with commentaries, Jerusalem, 5772, Harav Daniel Meir Assayag 
 Introduction to Sha'arei Yosher 

1860 births
1939 deaths
Kohanim writers of Rabbinic literature
Haredi rabbis in Europe
Lithuanian Haredi rabbis
Rosh yeshivas
Yeshiva University rosh yeshivas
Belarusian Jews
Rabbis from Grodno
Mir Yeshiva alumni